Emmanuel Lenain (born 27 March 1970) is the Ambassador of France to India.

References
Official biography on the website of the Embassy of France in India
 Pakistan needs to fulfill FATF commitment: French Envoy Emmanuel Lenain
 Atout France organises 5th edition of ‘Ambassador’s Travel Awards’ in Mumbai
 Delhi’s Proust Questionnaire – French Ambassador Emmanuel Lenain, Nyaya Marg, Chanakyapuri
 Rafale delivery on target, on schedule: French envoy

External links
Website of the Embassy of France in India

1970 births
Living people
Ambassadors of France to India
École nationale d'administration alumni
People from Cambrai